Christopher Joseph Giles (17 July 1928 – 27 November 2006) was a Republic of Ireland soccer international player, who was capped once for the Republic of Ireland at senior level, at home to Norway in November 1950.

Career 
In 1947–48, in his first season with Drumcondra F.C., he narrowly missed out on a League and Cup double. The Drums won the Championship only to lose in the FAI Cup final 2-1 to Shamrock Rovers. Giles won a second league medal with Drumcondra in 1948–49.

International 
Giles made his only appearance for Ireland on 26 November 1950 against Norway national football team.

Personal life 
He was son of John Giles and Cousin of Matt Giles & Dickie Giles. His nephew Johnny would go on to win numerous medals with Leeds United and captain and manage the Irish national team. His grand nephew Chris and Michael would both play in the League of Ireland as well.

External links
 Profile from soccerscene.ie

References

1928 births
2006 deaths
Republic of Ireland association footballers
Republic of Ireland international footballers
Doncaster Rovers F.C. players
Place of birth missing
Drumcondra F.C. players
Association football outside forwards